Fencing was inducted at the Youth Olympic Games at the inaugural edition in 2010.

Medal summaries

Boys

Épée

Foil

Sabre

Girls

Épée

Foil

Sabre

Mixed

Mixed team event

Medal table
As of the 2018 Summer Youth Olympics.

See also
Fencing at the Summer Olympics

External links
Youth Olympic Games

 
Youth Olympics
Fencing